Fanning's Castle, also called Whitamore's Castle, is the remains of a tower house and National Monument located in Limerick, Ireland.

Location

Fanning's Castle is located off Creagh Lane and Mary Street, opposite the tholsel, on King's Island.

History

Fanning's Castle was built c. 1641 by Mayor of Limerick Dominic Fanning.

Building

The walls of the tower house are of roughly squared limestone blocks of varying sizes. It was originally five storeys high, but only four storeys are now visible above ground level. The windows show ogee and mullions.

The tower house incorporated a turret staircase and battlements.

References

Castles in County Limerick
Buildings and structures in Limerick (city)
National Monuments in County Limerick
Historic house museums in the Republic of Ireland
Museums in County Limerick
Military and war museums in the Republic of Ireland